International Peace Garden Airport  is a public use airport in Rolette County, North Dakota, United States on the Canada–US border. It is included in the National Plan of Integrated Airport Systems for 2011–2015, which categorized it as a general aviation facility.

The airport is located just east of the International Peace Garden on the North Dakota/Manitoba border. It is an airport of entry to Canada and the United States for general aviation aircraft with no more than 15 passengers and is served by adjacent US and Canadian customs stations.

The airport is one of six airports that straddle the Canada–US border. The others are Avey Field State Airport, Whetstone International Airport, Coutts/Ross International Airport, Piney Pinecreek Border Airport, and Coronach/Scobey Border Station Airport.

Facilities and aircraft 

For the 12-month period ending September 4, 2011, the airport had 630 aircraft operations, an average of 52 per month: 71% general aviation, 16% air taxi, and 13% military.

See also 
 List of airports in North Dakota

References

External links 
 International Peace Garden Airport (S28) at North Dakota Aeronautics Commission airport directory
 Page about this airport on COPA's Places to Fly airport directory
 Aerial image as of June 1995 from USGS The National Map
 

Airports in North Dakota
Buildings and structures in Rolette County, North Dakota
Transportation in Rolette County, North Dakota
Binational airports